Christ Driving the Money Changers from the Temple is a  painting by El Greco, from 1568, now in the National Gallery of Art in Washington, D.C., in the United States. It depicts the Cleansing of the Temple, an event in the Life of Christ.

There exist three other copies of the painting and also a faithful reproduction in the National Gallery in London, which has recently been considered as authentic by scholars in the field of visual arts. Two versions and that other on loan from Madrid are titled Purification of the Temple. The one at the National Gallery in Washington is called Christ Cleansing the Temple. The painting which bears this actual title belongs to the Minneapolis Institute of Art and it is somewhat different from all the other versions of this legendary  Christian scene.

Analysis
It is considered by several authors as the masterpiece of the Venetian period of El Greco. Despite containing some Cretan elements acquired during his formal training, this painting can be fully considered a work of the Italian Renaissance. Perspective emphasizes the handling of the anatomy, the application of color and drama of the scene.

This is a picture of varied influences, from Tintoretto to Michelangelo and Raphael through Paolo Veronese, and other painters of the Cinquecento venetian school. Still, some errors are seen like the absence of a point of view, the difficulty in making complex groups and the lack of experience in modeling figures.

Bibliography
Álvarez Lopera, José. (2005) El Greco. Madrid: Arlanza, Biblioteca «Descubrir el Arte», (colección «Grandes maestros»). .
Scholz-Hansel, Michael. (2003) El Greco. Colonia: Taschen. .

References

Attribution

This article is based on the translation of the corresponding article of Spanish Wikipedia.

1568 paintings
Paintings by El Greco
Collections of the National Gallery of Art
Paintings depicting the Passion of Jesus
Birds in art
Paintings of children